Naval Support Activity Philadelphia is a  United States Navy base located in the Lawncrest section of Northeast Philadelphia, Pennsylvania and located  east of its parent command, NSA Mechanicsburg. With the exception of a few buildings, much of the base is industrial in style, and consists of office-converted warehouses for the various Naval supply commands located on the installation. It also provides support services to Navy units that are situated at the Philadelphia Navy Yard Annex.

History 
The history of what is now Naval Support Activity Philadelphia began during World War II as the Naval Aviation Supply Depot in 1942. Prior to its purchase by the Navy in 1942, NSA Philadelphia was home to the Keystone Brick Company. A bustling enterprise that provided many facades throughout the city. One of the company’s most famous buildings was its headquarters. With elaborate brickwork, both interior and exterior, it was a structure of regional prominence. After purchasing the brickyard site, the Navy refurbished the building into “Quarters A” home to the highest-ranking officer on the installation.

From its inception, the Depot would act as not just a home to Naval Aviation parts, but was also the headquarters of Defense Industrial Supply Center, the predecessor to Defense Logistics Agency., who operated out of the Schuylkill Arsenal in Philadelphia. Built to function as a quartermaster and provide the U.S. military with supplies, one of its most famous tasks was outfitting the Lewis and Clark Expedition. This organization would grow and transition into the Defense Industrial Supply Center, and its headquarters would locate at the Naval Aviation Supply Depot Compound in Northeast Philadelphia in the mid-1940s.

In the late 1940s, the supply depot mission at NSA Philadelphia began to phase out. In response, the Navy converted storehouse space into offices, a trend that continued for decades. Through its more recent history the Naval Support Activity has grown as Base Realignment and Closure Commission actions consolidated missions and moved them to the installation.

Tenant Commands 
Defense Logistics Agency (DLA) and the Naval Supply Systems Command (NAVSUP) are the two major tenants of the installations. Navy Recruiting Command's District Philadelphia is headquartered here as well, along with Civil Air Patrol (CAP) Squadron 104, U.S. Naval Sea Cadet Corps's San Antonio Division and the Navy Special Emphasis Office of the Defense Contract Management Agency (DCMA). The Navy Office of Civilian Human Resources has also maintained its Philadelphia Operations Center on the base, since it moved from the Philadelphia Bourse building in 2011 after a BRAC decision.

References

External links 
 Base Guide for NSA Mechanicsburg - NSA Philadelphia - Philadelphia Naval Yard

Naval Support Activities of the United States Navy
Military installations established in 1942